Edward Edmond Barrett (3 November 1877 – 19 March 1932) was a track and field athlete, wrestler and hurler. He was born in Rahela, Ballyduff, County Kerry, Ireland.

Barrett played hurling with the local Ballyduff team. He emigrated to London, joined a local hurling club and was selected for the London GAA team. He was a corner-forward on the London team which won the 1901 All-Ireland Championship, beating Cork GAA 1–5 to 0–4 in the final. It remains London's only senior All-Ireland hurling Championship title. Barrett also appeared for London in the final of the following year, but this time Cork gained revenge, thrashing London 3–13 to 0–0.

He won a gold medal as part of the City of London Police tug-of-war team in the 1908 Olympic Games in London. He also won a bronze medal in the heavyweight division of the freestyle wrestling competition.

Barrett also competed in the shot, javelin and discus competitions in the 1908 athletics programme, but wrestling was his premier sport. He was British heavyweight freestyle champion in 1909 and 1911. Barrett also competed in Greco-Roman wrestling in both 1908 and the Stockholm Olympics of 1912. He was defeated in the first round on both occasions.

References

External links
 Edward Barrett's profile at databaseOlympics
 

1877 births
1932 deaths
City of London Police officers
Irish male shot putters
Irish male discus throwers
Irish male javelin throwers
Olympic athletes of Great Britain
Olympic tug of war competitors of Great Britain
Olympic wrestlers of Great Britain
Athletes (track and field) at the 1908 Summer Olympics
Tug of war competitors at the 1908 Summer Olympics
Wrestlers at the 1908 Summer Olympics
Wrestlers at the 1912 Summer Olympics
Irish male sport wrestlers
British male sport wrestlers
Olympic gold medallists for Great Britain
Olympic bronze medallists for Great Britain
Sportspeople from County Kerry
London inter-county hurlers
Ballyduff (Kerry) hurlers
All-Ireland Senior Hurling Championship winners
Olympic medalists in wrestling
Olympic medalists in tug of war
Medalists at the 1908 Summer Olympics